Montjuïc is a hill in Barcelona, Catalonia, Spain.

Montjuïc, meaning Mount of the Jews, may also refer to:

Barcelona, Spain
 Montjuïc Castle, a 17th-century military fortress
 Montjuïc Cemetery, a modern-day cemetery

Girona
 Montjuïc (Girona)

Battles
 Battle of Montjuïc (1641), during the Reapers' War
 Battle of Montjuïc (1705), during the War of the Spanish Succession

Other uses
 Mont Juic (suite), an orchestral composition written jointly by Lennox Berkeley and Benjamin Britten

See also
 
 :ca:Montjuïc  (disambiguation) Other articles relating to Montjuïc in the Catalan Wikipedia